In South Africa, a metropolitan municipality or Category A municipality is a municipality which executes all the functions of local government for a city or conurbation. This is by contrast to areas which are primarily rural, where the local government is divided into district municipalities and local municipalities.

The Constitution, section 155.1.a, defines "Category A" municipalities. In the Municipal Structures Act it is laid out that this type of local government is to be used for conurbations, "centre[s] of economic activity", areas "for which integrated development planning is desirable", and areas with "strong interdependent social and economic linkages".

The metropolitan municipality is similar to the consolidated city-county in the US, although a South African metropolitan municipality is created by notice of the provincial government, not by agreement between district and local municipalities.

History
Metropolitan municipalities were brought about during reforms of the 1990s so that cities could be governed as single entities. For example, eThekwini (including Durban) is today a single municipality formed from what were more than 40 separate jurisdictions before 1994.

This reform process was a response to the way in which apartheid policy had broken up municipal governance. For example, Soweto had, until 1973, been administered by the Johannesburg City Council, but after 1973 was run by an Administration Board separate from the city council. This arrangement deprived Soweto of vital subsidies that it had been receiving from Johannesburg. A key demand of anti-apartheid civics in the 1980s was for 'one city, one tax base' in order to facilitate the equitable distribution of funds within what was a functionally integrated urban space.

Local government reform after apartheid produced six Transitional Metropolitan Councils following the 1995/6 local government elections. These were characterized by a two-tier structure. From 2000, these six Metropolitan Councils were restructured into their final single-tier form. In 2011, Buffalo City (including East London) and Mangaung (including Bloemfontein) were added to the category of metropolitan municipality.

List of metropolitan municipalities

See also
 Urban planning in Africa

References

Other sources
 Government Communication & Information Services (2005) Categories of municipalities
 Parliament of the Republic of South Africa (1996) Constitution of the Republic of South Africa, Chapter 7: Local Government
 Parliament of the Republic of South Africa (1998) Local Government: Municipal Structures Act, Act 117 of 1998.
 South African Local Government Association